Albany is a port city in the Great Southern region in the Australian state of Western Australia,  southeast of Perth, the state capital. The city centre is at the northern edge of Princess Royal Harbour, which is a part of King George Sound. The central business district is bounded by Mount Clarence to the east and Mount Melville to the west. The city is in the local government area of the City of Albany. While it is the oldest colonial, although not European, settlement in Western Australia - predating Perth and Fremantle by over two years - it was a semi-exclave of New South Wales for over four years until it was made part of the Swan River Colony.

The settlement was founded on 26 December 1826 as a military outpost of New South Wales for the purpose of forestalling French ambitions in the region. To that end, on 21 January 1827, the commander of the outpost, Major Edmund Lockyer, formally took possession for the British Crown of the portion of New Holland not yet claimed by the Crown; that is, the portion west of the 129th meridian east, with the portion east already being claimed collectively by the Crown as New South Wales and Van Diemen's Land. During the last decade of the 19th century, the town served as a gateway to the Eastern Goldfields. For many years, it was the colony's only deep-water port, having a place of eminence on shipping services between Britain and its Australian colonies. The opening of the Fremantle Inner Harbour in 1897, however, saw its importance as a port decline, after which the town's industries turned primarily to agriculture, timber and later, whaling.

Contemporary Albany is the southern terminus for tourism in the region, and the state's south west, which is known for its natural environment and preservation of its heritage. The town has a role in the ANZAC legend, being the last port of call for troopships departing Australia in the First World War. On 1 November 2014, the Australian and New Zealand Prime Ministers opened the National Anzac Centre in Mount Clarence, Albany, to commemorate 100 years since the first ANZAC troops departed from King George Sound. Approximately 40,000 people attended the commemoration events held between 30 October and 2 November 2014. 

An auxiliary submarine base for the US Navy's 7th Fleet was developed during the Second World War in the event the submarine base at Fremantle was lost. Also in the harbour was a Royal Australian Navy naval installation which provided for refuelling from four  fuel tanks.

Etymology
Upon its establishment in 1826, the settlement was named Frederick Town in honour of Prince Frederick, Duke of York and Albany. In 1831, the settlement was transferred to the control of the Swan River Colony and renamed Albany by Lieutenant-Governor James Stirling.

The name of the area in the Nyungar language of the Menang people is Kinjarling, which has been said to mean "place of plenty" and "place of rain". In 2020, the City of Albany began, as part of an official dual-naming project, to give prominence to “Kinjarling” as the city's Aboriginal name.

Early history

Kinjarling was home to Menang Noongar tribes during the summer season. Early British explorers recorded evidence of fish traps located on Emu Point and on the French, now the Kalgan, River. Vancouver made attempts to find the inhabitants of the area but only found bark dwellings that were unoccupied. Later explorers made contact and were told to leave, but were accepted when they did not. Most of the British exploration was undertaken to survey the land and sea to assess the profitability of resources. The explorers occasionally noted encounters with Noongars. Native treatment laws and programs have affected the tribes since settlement.

Heritage buildings
There are a number of heritage buildings in Albany;  see List of heritage places in the City of Albany and :Category:Heritage places in Albany, Western Australia. These include:

The Old Farm, Strawberry Hill was established in 1827 as a government farm to feed the colonial soldiers stationed around King George's Sound. It is the oldest farm in Western Australia. The homestead, which became the home of the Government Resident in 1833, is an example of a colonial gentleman's residence. After a chequered history, the property was vested in the National Trust WA in 1964 and is now a house museum.
Patrick Taylor Cottage (1832), Western Australia's oldest surviving dwelling, built in 1832 by the Morley Brothers. It is now maintained by the Albany Historical Society.
St John's Church (1841–1848) is a stone building with shingled roofs in the Old Colonial Gothick Picturesque style. Set among trees, it was designed to be part of an overall contrived picturesque scene in the manner of an English garden landscape.
Scots Uniting Church (1892) was designed in the Victorian Academic Gothic style by Melbourne architect Evander McIver and built with local granite stonework.
The complex now known as The Residency Museum was established in 1850 as a depot for the Convict Establishment in Albany. It is an L shaped, single-storied, masonry building with a timber framed, timber shingled roof. In 1873 it was converted into the Resident Magistrate's home. It now serves as a museum.
The Victorian Free Classical Revival style Town Hall (1888) is a two-storey stone building with a prominent clock tower, which dominates York Street, the main street of Albany. It has been put to many uses apart from council meetings, including public entertainment and public meetings of all kinds and even as the venue for the first regional meeting of the State Parliament.
The Old Post Office was built in two stages, the first was designed in 1869 by J Manning, the second, including a prominent tower, was designed in 1896 by George Temple-Poole. It now houses the Albany campus of the University of Western Australia.
The Court House, constructed of Albany brick and granite with a tiled roof, was designed in the Federation Romanesque style by the Public Works Department under the supervision of George Temple-Poole and Hillson Beasley in 1897.
Another example of the work of George Temple Poole is the limestone and shingle Federation Arts and Crafts style Cottage Hospital, designed in 1886 and completed in 1897. It is one of the oldest hospitals in the state and served as such until 1962. It is now occupied by the Vancouver Arts Centre (named after the explorer George Vancouver).

Some of the above information is derived from the State Heritage Register where these places are registered. The assessment criteria contain more details.

Population
In June 2018, the urban population of Albany was 34,205 making it the state's sixth-largest population centre.
 Aboriginal and Torres Strait Islander people made up 3.5% of the population. 
 74.3% of people were born in Australia. The next most common countries of birth were United Kingdom 7.5%, New Zealand 1.7%, Philippines 1.6%, and South Africa 1.1%.   
  86.8% of people only spoke English at home. Other languages spoken at home included Filipino 0.7%, Italian 0.6%, Tagalog 0.6%, Afrikaans 0.6% and German 0.4%. 
 The most common religious denominations were Anglican 16.5% and Catholic 13.1%. 37.4% had no religion and 10.4% did not respond.

Geography

The city centre of Albany is located between the hills of Mount Melville and Mount Clarence, which look down into Princess Royal Harbour. Many beaches surround Albany, with Middleton Beach being the closest to the town centre. Other popular beaches include Frenchman Bay and Muttonbird Island.

Albany is  SSE of the state capital, Perth, to which it is linked by Albany Highway.

Wine region
Albany is a sub-region of the Great Southern region of Western Australia.

Coastline

The Albany coastline is notorious for deaths due to king waves washing people off rocks.  The Torndirrup National Park features some of the more rugged coastline in the area. However, there are many beaches that are safe and usable.

Betty's Beach was named after Betty Jones, who used to go camping there with her family, and was initially called Betty's Bay.

Frenchman Bay Beach is adjacent to the Torndirrup National Park, and was originally called Quarantine Bay, owing to the quarantine station set up by the British in 1826 on Mistaken Island at the northern end of Goode Beach

However, the beach was named Tourism Australia Best Beach 2022 by Tourism Australia, described a "[ticking] all the boxes of what the typical beachgoer is looking for — uncrowded, crystal-white sand, turquoise waters and a very dramatic granite backdrop".

Other beaches include:
 Emu Point
 Gull Rock Beach, also known as Boiler Beach
 Middleton Beach
 Nanarup Beach
 Muttonbird Beach
 Cosy Corner
 Two Peoples Bay, including Little Beach and Waterfall Beach

Climate
Albany has a warm-summer Mediterranean climate (Köppen Csb) with dry, warm summers, mild, wet winters, and pleasant springs and autumns. Summers have short spells of very hot weather, but cool ocean breeze brings relief, especially during evenings and nights. The city is situated on what is promoted as the "Rainbow Coast", an appropriate title given the frequency of days with both sun and drizzle or showers. Albany has 44.8 clear days annually.

Rain in excess of  occurs on two days out of every three during an average winter.

Albany received a record amount of rain on 20 November 2008 when violent storms swept across the Great Southern region. The town was flooded after  of rain fell in a 24-hour period, the highest amount recorded since rainfall records began in 1877. The wettest month on record was June 1920 when  fell, while February 1877 and February 1879 remain the only rainless months.

Industry

Albany's main industries are tourism, fishing, timber (wood chips) and agriculture. From 1952 to 1978 whaling was a major source of income and employment for the local population.

The Whaling Station, which closed operations in 1978, has been converted to a museum of whaling and features one of the 'Cheynes' whale chasers that were used for whaling in Albany. The station was the last operating whaling station in the southern hemisphere and the English-speaking world at the time of closure.

The Western Power Wind Farm is located at Sand Patch, to the west of Albany. The wind farm, originally commissioned in 2001 with 12 turbines, now has 18 turbines, driven by strong southerly winds, and can generate up to 80% of the city's electricity usage.

Albany has a number of historical sites including the Museum, Albany Convict Gaol, The Princess Royal Fortress (commonly known as The Forts) and Patrick Taylor Cottage, one of the oldest dwellings in Western Australia, . Albany has a great deal of historical significance to Western Australia.

Natural sights along the rugged coastline include the 'Natural Bridge' and the 'Gap'. The beaches have pristine white sand. The destroyer  was sunk in King George Sound in 2001 as a dive wreck. Albany is also close to two low mountain ranges, the Porongurups and Stirling Ranges.

Albany is the southern terminus of the Bibbulmun Track walking trail.

Albany is the southern terminus of the Munda Biddi Trail off-road cycling trail.

Albany is home to HMAS Albany (based in Darwin) and the adopted home port of the Royal Australian Navy frigate . Albany is frequently visited by other warships.

Transport
Albany has a city bus service run by Swan Transit with five town routes. Albany is connected to Perth with road-coach services via Walpole and Bunbury; via Katanning and Northam; via Kojonup and Williams. Transwa coaches also serve Jerramungup, Ravensthorpe and Hopetoun.

Regional Express Airlines, a national independent regional airline, provides 23 services a week between Perth and Albany Airport using 34-passenger turboprop Saab 340 aircraft.

Albany was served by the Albany Progress passenger train from Perth until 1978. The railway station reopened as a tourist information centre in 1994.

Media
Albany radio stations include locally owned broadcaster GOLD MX and FLY FM as well as national broadcasters 783 Triple M (formerly 6VA and RadioWest), Rete Italia, Vision FM, HitFM (formerly HOT FM), ABC Great Southern, ABC News, ABC Radio National, ABC Classic FM, Triple J, Racing Radio & Great Southern FM.

Below is a table showing the broadcast frequencies on which these services can be received.

Localised television stations available in Albany include GWN7, WIN Television Western Australia, West Digital Television, SBS and ABC Television Western Australia. GWN7 broadcasts a half-hour news program for regional WA, GWN7 News, at 5:30pm on weeknights with a district newsroom covering Albany and surrounding areas based in the city.

Below is a table showing the full suite of digital television services available in Albany.
These services are broadcast from Mount Clarence and cover the majority of the geographic area with some areas requiring a signal to be received from the Southern Agricultural site at Mount Barker. Both these transmission sites employ vertical polarity. Furthermore, a number of residents rely on receiving these services via satellite using the Viewer Access Satellite Television system.

Local newspapers are the Albany Advertiser (established 1888) and The Extra (owned by Seven West Media Limited, publishers of The West Australian). Local radio stations GOLD MX and Fly FM are owned by local independent broadcaster BARRICADES MEDIA.

Sport
Two of Albany's major sports facilities are Collingwood Park Stadium in Collingwood Park and Centennial Oval in Centennial Park. Collingwood Park is home to North Albany Football Club while Centennial Oval is home to Royals Football Club.

Albany Leisure and Aquatic Centre is the home of Albany Basketball Association. The Rainbow Coast Raiders of the State Basketball League played at the Albany Sports Centre (33 Barker Road) between 1989 and 1999. 33 Barker Road is now the home of Albany Indoor Beach Volleyball.

Education
There are currently several primary schools, eight high schools and one university campus in the Albany area.

Primary schools
 Albany Primary School
 Flinders Park Primary
 Mount Lockyer Primary
 Parklands School
 Spencer Park Primary
 Yakamia Primary
 Woodbury Boston Primary School
 OneSchool Global (Albany)
 Little Grove Primary School
 St Joseph's College
 Great Southern Grammar
 Bethel Christian School
 Australian Christian College Southlands
 John Calvin School

High schools
 Albany Senior High School 7–12
 Albany Secondary Education Support Centre 7–13
 Australian Christian College - Southlands K-12
 North Albany Senior High School 7–12
 Great Southern Grammar K-12
 St Joseph's College K-12
 Bethel Christian School K-12
 John Calvin School K-10

Universities
 A campus of the University of Western Australia
 Some courses delivered by Curtin University

TAFE
 South Regional TAFE

Localities

Notable residents

See also
 Albany Regional Prison
 City of Albany
 Electoral district of Albany
 Port of Albany

Notes

References

Bibliography

External links

 
 City of Albany
 Albany - Official Tourism Site
 Albany Entertainment Centre
 Albany Historical Society (Inc)
 Albany Tourism Guide along the Rainbow Coast
 National Anzac Centre

Wikisource
 

 
1826 establishments in Australia
Former exclaves
Great Southern (Western Australia)
Port cities in Western Australia
Populated places established in 1826